The patadyong (pronounced pa-tad-jóng, also called patadyung, patadjong, habol, or habul), is an indigenous Philippine rectangular or tube-like wraparound skirt worn by both men and women of the Visayas islands and the Sulu Archipelago, similar to the Malong, or Sarong. It was also historically worn in parts of Luzon like Pampanga and Sorsogon. 

In the precolonial era, it was usually worn with a barú or bayú, a simple collar-less shirt or jacket with close-fitting long sleeves. During the Spanish period, this evolved into the kimona, a variant of the baro't saya worn by Christianized Visayan lowlanders consisting of a loose translucent blouse, an undershirt, and a patadyong or a patadyong-patterned skirt.

The patadyong is identical to the malong used in mainland Mindanao, but is longer than the tapis of Luzon; it is also identical to the sarong of neighboring Indonesia, Brunei, and Malaysia, for which only the designating name changes (patadyong in Visayan languages vs. sarong in Malay language). Its name means "straight [in shape]" in Visayan languages, from the root word tadlong, "[to go] straight"; its alternative name "habol" or "habul" means "woven [textile]", though it usually means "blanket" in modern Visayan.

See also 
 Barong Tagalog
 Baro't saya
 Maria Clara gown

References

External links 
 

National symbols of the Philippines
History of Asian clothing
Textile arts
Skirts
Philippine clothing
Philippine handicrafts